The Dan Cameron Bridge is a four-lane automobile bridge spanning the Northeast Cape Fear River and US 421, located in New Hanover County.  The bridge carries I-140 and is named after Dan Cameron, who was a successful civic leader, businessman and one-term mayor of Wilmington from 1955 to 1957.

History

See also

References

External links
 

Buildings and structures in New Hanover County, North Carolina
Road bridges in North Carolina
Bridges completed in 2005
U.S. Route 17
Bridges of the United States Numbered Highway System
Bridges on the Interstate Highway System
Box girder bridges in the United States
2005 establishments in North Carolina